Greg Jonathan Brown (born 31 July 1978) in Wythenshawe, Manchester, England, is an English retired professional footballer who played as a defender for various teams in the Football League.

External links

1978 births
Living people
People from Wythenshawe
English footballers
Association football defenders
Macclesfield Town F.C. players
Chester City F.C. players
Morecambe F.C. players
English Football League players